is an airline with its headquarters on the grounds of Ryūgasaki Airfield in Ryūgasaki, Ibaraki Prefecture, Japan. It operates domestic services and its main base is Chōfu Airport, Tokyo.

Destinations 
The airline operates flights from Chōfu Airport, in Tokyo, to the following destinations within Japan islands (as of June 2014):

Fleet 
The New Central Airservice fleet consists of the following aircraft (as of August 2019):

Former fleet
New Central Airservice has also operated the following aircraft, which have since been retired;

References

External links
Official website 

Airlines of Japan
Regional airlines of Japan
Companies based in Ibaraki Prefecture